Spaeth, Spæth, or Späth is a surname, and may refer to:

Spaeth 
Barbette Spaeth (born ?), American professor and Roman mythology expert
Diana Palmer (author) (born Susan Spaeth, 1946), American romance novelist
George Spaeth (born 1932), American ophthalmologist specializing in glaucoma
Harriet Reynolds Krauth Spaeth (1845-1925), American organist, hymnwriter, translator
Johann Peter Spaeth (17th century–1701), Austrian theologian; Judaism convert from Christianity
John Duncan Spaeth (1868−1954), American philologist and professor
Matt Spaeth (born 1983), American football player
Merrie Spaeth (born 1948), American actress and public relations/communications consultant
Nicholas Spaeth (1950–2014), American jurist and politician
Ove von Spaeth (born 1938), Danish writer, graphic designer, and independent scholar
Paul Spaeth (born ?), American musician and composer
Sigmund Spaeth 1885–1965), American musicologist, composer, and radio personality
Tony Spaeth (1934–2021), American corporate identity planner, consultant, critic, and teacher

Späth 
Ernst Späth (1886–1946), Austrian chemist
Franz Ludwig Späth (1838–1913), a German botanist and nurseryman; father of Hellmut Ludwig Späth, son of Ludwig Späth
Georg Späth (born 1981), German ski jumper and Olympics competitor
Gerold Späth (born 1939), Swiss poet and writer
Hellmut Ludwig Späth (1885–1945), German botanist and nurseryman; son of Franz Ludwig Späth, grandson of Ludwig Späth
Joseph Späth (1823–1896), Austrian obstetrician and professor
Louis Späth (1892), German botanist
Lothar Späth (1937–2016), German politician
Ludwig Späth (1793–1883), a German botanist and nurseryman; Father of Franz Ludwig Späth, grandfather of Hellmut Ludwig Späth
Manuel Späth (born 1985), German handballer
Melanie Späth (born 1981), Irish racing cyclist
Trudy Späth-Schweizer (1908–1990), Swiss politician; first female Swiss office holder

See also 
Spaeth Design (founded 1947), American marketing firm
Spæth House (built 1765–1770), Helsingør, Denmark
Späth-Arboretum (founded in 1879), Berlin, Germany
Späth nursery (founded 1790), Berlin, Germany

Surnames from nicknames